German submarine U-5 was a Type IIA U-boat of Nazi Germany's Kriegsmarine. She was laid down on 11 February 1935, launched on 14 August and commissioned 31 August that year, under Oberleutnant zur See Rolf Dau.

U-5 served mostly as a training boat from 1935 to 1940, but did see two wartime patrols in 1940. She was transferred to the 21st U-boat Flotilla on 1 July 1940.

U-5 was sunk on 19 March 1943 in a diving accident west of Pillau (now Baltiysk in Russia); 16 of the 37-man crew survived.

Design
U-5 had a displacement of  when at the surface and  while submerged. She had two shafts and two  propellers.

U-5 was fitted with three  torpedo tubes at the bow, five torpedoes or up to twelve Type A torpedo mines, and a  anti-aircraft gun. The boat had a complement of 25.

References

Bibliography

External links
 

German Type II submarines
U-boats commissioned in 1935
U-boats sunk in 1943
World War II submarines of Germany
World War II shipwrecks in the Baltic Sea
1935 ships
Ships built in Kiel
U-boat lost in diving accidents
Maritime incidents in March 1943